Thomas Keane may refer to:

Tom Keane (1926–2001), American football cornerback
Tom Keane, musician, see The Keane Brothers
Rory Keane (Thomas Roderick Keane, 1922–2004), Irish footballer
Tommy Keane (1968–2012), Irish footballer
Thomas E. Keane (1905–1996), American politician
Thomas P. Keane (1878–1945), American politician

See also
Tom Kean (disambiguation)
Tom Keene (disambiguation)